Edmund Engelman (1907 – 2000) was a Jewish Austrian (Viennese), and later American, photographer and engineer who became famous for photographing the home and workplace of Sigmund Freud at Berggasse 19 in Vienna, shortly before the Freud family escaped Austria for England in 1938.

After emigrating to the US in 1939, he established a career working on the development of photographic developing equipment. At this time he did not have his negatives and was uncertain of their whereabouts, but after World War II he was able to retrieve them from Freud's daughter Anna Freud. Engelmann took approximately 150 photos of the offices and some of the living quarters at Berggasse 19. Among other thing they portray Freud's massive collection of antiques, the famous couch where the patients reclined as well as a few photos of Freud himself. He could not use a flash because the apartment was said to be under surveillance by the Gestapo. In the postscript "A memoir" published in the book "Sigmund Freud. Berggasse 19, Vienna" (Brandstätter, 2016, 5th revised edition). Engelmann himself writes about the event: "I remember that I was both excited and afraid as I walked through the empty streets toward Berggasse 19 that wet May morning in 1938, I carried a little valise filled with my cameras, tripod, lenses, and film and it seemed to become heavier and heavier with every step. I was convinced that anyone who saw me would instantly know that I was on my way to the office of Dr. Sigmund Freud – on a mission that would hardly have pleased the Nazis."

He died in April 2000 at Lenox Hill Hospital in Manhattan.

References

Austrian emigrants to the United States
Photographers from Vienna
20th-century Austrian engineers
1907 births
2000 deaths